The canton of Menton is an administrative division of the Alpes-Maritimes department, southeastern France. It was created at the French canton reorganisation which came into effect in March 2015. Its seat is in Menton.

Composition

It consists of the following communes:

Castellar
Castillon
Gorbio
Menton
Roquebrune-Cap-Martin
Sainte-Agnès

Councillors

Pictures of the canton

References

Cantons of Alpes-Maritimes